The boys' monobob competition at the 2020 Winter Youth  Olympics took place on 20 January at the St. Moritz-Celerina Olympic Bobrun.

Results
The first run was held at 12:00 and the second run at 13:15.

References

Boys' monobob